Eupithecia famularia is a moth in the  family Geometridae. It is found in Ecuador.

References

Moths described in 1890
famularia
Moths of South America